Presidential elections were held for the first time in Burundi on 31 August 1984. Incumbent Jean-Baptiste Bagaza of the Union for National Progress (UPRONA; then the sole legal party) was the only candidate, and was re-elected with 99.63% of the vote. Voter turnout was 98.3%.

References

Presidential elections in Burundi
1984 in Burundi
One-party elections
Burundi
Single-candidate elections
Election and referendum articles with incomplete results